The 2022 MLS SuperDraft was the 23rd edition of the SuperDraft conducted by Major League Soccer. The SuperDraft is held every January prior to the start of the MLS season and has been conducted via conference calls since 2020. Previously, the SuperDraft had been held in conjunction with the annual January United Soccer Coaches convention.

Since 2021, the SuperDraft consists of three rounds. Teams that received fourth-round picks for this draft via past trades received compensatory picks instead. Of the 75 players selected in the SuperDraft, 28 were signed by MLS teams—most of them from the first round picks.

Format
The SuperDraft format has remained constant throughout its history and closely resembles that of the NFL Draft:

Any expansion teams receive the first picks. MLS has announced that Charlotte FC would begin play as an expansion team in 2022. Sacramento Republic and St. Louis City SC were about to debut that year, but MLS delayed St. Louis's start to 2023 instead, and the league's expansion to Sacramento was withheld indefinitely.
Non-playoff clubs receive the next picks in reverse order of prior season finish.
Teams that made the MLS Cup Playoffs are then ordered by which round of the playoffs they are eliminated.
The winners of the MLS Cup are given the last selection, and the losers the penultimate selection.

Player selection

Round 1

Round 2

Round 3

Compensatory picks

Notable undrafted players

Homegrown players

Eligible players who signed outside of MLS in 2021 
This is a list of eligible players who signed in leagues outside of MLS prior to the SuperDraft, but were still draft eligible.

Summary

Selections by college athletic conference

Schools with multiple draft selections

2022 SuperDraft trades
Round 1

Round 2

Round 3

Compensatory picks

References 

Major League Soccer drafts
SuperDraft
MLS SuperDraft